James Botham (born 22 February 1998) is a Welsh rugby union player who plays for Cardiff Rugby as a flanker. He is a Wales international.

Early life
The grandson of all-round cricketer Ian Botham, James was born in Cardiff while his father Liam Botham was playing for Cardiff RFC as a wing. After his father moved to Newcastle Falcons for the 2000–01 season, James was educated at Sedbergh School, a boarding school in Cumbria.

Club career
Botham joined the Cardiff academy in 2016, and in the 2018–19 season started making appearances for the senior team, initially in the Anglo-Welsh Cup, and then debuted in the Pro14 against Connacht Rugby. Botham signed his first professional contract with Cardiff in March 2019.

Botham was selected as Man of the Match against the Dragons on 26 December 2020.

International career
Botham made his debut for Wales U18 on 25 March 2016 against Scotland under-18 at St. Helen's Rugby and Cricket Ground, Swansea, scoring a try in the 31-30 victory. Botham made his first appearance for Wales U20 in the 2017 Six Nations Under 20s Championship.

In early 2017, Botham was selected by Wales Sevens for the World Rugby Sevens Series, making his first appearance during the New Zealand leg.

On 16 November 2020, Botham was called up to the senior Wales rugby side for the Autumn Nations Cup tournament. Botham made his test debut against Georgia on 21 November 2020, starting on the blindside. He started the following two matches of the tournament, against England and Italy.

Botham was selected in the squad for the 2021 Six Nations Championship, making three appearances off the bench as Wales won the championship and Triple Crown.

Botham retained his place in the squad for the 2021 July rugby union tests, and score his first try for Wales in the win over Canada. Botham made two further appearances, starting both matches against Argentina.

Ahead of the 2021–22 season, Botham underwent shoulder surgery, which ruled him out of the 2021 end-of-year rugby union internationals. Botham was not selected for the 2022 Six Nations squad, having suffered a head injury just prior.

International tries

References

External links 
Cardiff profile
Wales profile

Rugby union players from Cardiff
Cardiff Rugby players
Living people
1998 births
Welsh rugby union players
Wales international rugby union players
People educated at Sedbergh School
Rugby union flankers